William Joseph Landy was an Australian rules footballer who played with Geelong in the Victorian Football League. Joining the army at the age of 18, he was killed in action at Fromelles during World War I.

See also
 List of Victorian Football League players who died in active service

Sources
Holmesby, Russell & Main, Jim (2007). The Encyclopedia of AFL Footballers. 7th ed. Melbourne: Bas Publishing.

1897 births
1916 deaths
Australian rules footballers from Victoria (Australia)
Geelong Football Club players
Australian military personnel killed in World War I